Fairfield Township is the name of three townships in the U.S. state of Indiana:

 Fairfield Township, DeKalb County, Indiana
 Fairfield Township, Franklin County, Indiana
 Fairfield Township, Tippecanoe County, Indiana

Indiana township disambiguation pages